Aiquile is a town in the Cochabamba Department, Bolivia. It is the capital of the Narciso Campero Province and Aiquile Municipality. Most of its population is Quechua, and its residents are reputed to be the best charango makers in the country.

External links 
Map of Narciso Campero Province
World Gazetteer

Populated places in Cochabamba Department